Russell Jolly (born August 16, 1955) is an American politician who served in the Mississippi State Senate from the 8th district from 2011 to 2020.

References

1955 births
Living people
Democratic Party Mississippi state senators